Agrochola humilis is a moth of the family Noctuidae. It is found in parts of Central- and Southern-Europe and Asia Minor.

The wingspan is 30–40 mm. Forewings are long and narrow. Ground color is pale brown, ash grey or olive-grey. Ante- and postmedial-lines are double, nearly straight, subterminal line ochreous, frequently interrupted with dark spots. Veins are clearly visible, orbicular and reniform stigmata large, pale beige-brown encircled. Hindwings are pale ochreous grey, mostly showing a dark discal spot.

The moth flies from September to October preferably in dry oakwoods. They are strongly attracted to artificial light and sugar bait. The egg overwinters.

The larvae feed on the leaves of various plants. Recorded food plants include Fraxinus,  Salix, Ulmus, Taraxacum and Plantago.

Subspecies
Agrochola humilis humilis
Agrochola humilis anatolica Pinker, 1980 (Turkey)

References
László Ronkay, José Luis Yela, Márton Hreblay: Hadeninae II. - Noctuidae Europaeae, Volume 5., page 83/84, Sorø, 2001,

External links

Fauna Europaea
Lepiforum.de

Agrochola
Moths described in 1775
Moths of Europe
Moths of Asia
Taxa named by Michael Denis
Taxa named by Ignaz Schiffermüller